Alfred Hans Emil Friedrich von Böckmann was a German general in World War I. He commanded several corps throughout the war and commanded the Guard Corps during the Fifth Battle of Ypres.

Early Military Career
Alfred von Böckmann was born on 22 September 1859 in Potsdam. After joining the Imperial German Army], Böckmann reached the rank of lieutenant in 1880 and in April 1907, he became chief of staff of the XIV Corps located in Karlsruhe. In March 1911, Böckmann was given command of a regiment stationed in Schwerin and in November 1912, he became the commander of the 75th Infantry Brigade on 8 February 1914, which was based in Allenstein.

World War I
At the beginning of World War I, the 75th Infantry Brigade was part of the 37th Division, which was part of the 8th Army on the Eastern Front. Commanding the 75th Infantry Brigade, Böckmann participated in the decisive German victory at the Battle of Tannenberg. After a month and a half in command of the 75th Brigade, in mid-September 1914, Böckmann was given a new command of the 41st Division, which he commanded for two months.

After Otto von Below became the commander of the 8th Army in November 1914, Böckmann was made Chief of the General Staff of the 8th Army, with which he participated in the Second Battle of the Masurian Lakes. With the formation of the Army of the Niemen from units of the 8th Army, in May 1915, Böckmann became its chief of staff. When Otto von Below was transferred to the Macedonian front and became the commander of Army Group Below, Böckmann became the chief of staff of the said army group. He remained the chief of staff of the army group even after Friedrich von Scholtz took over command of the same from Below.

In August 1917, Böckmann became commander of the III Reserve Corps which he commanded until September when he received command of the XIV Corps. Böckmann didn't command the corps for too long because by November 1917, he became the commander of the prestigious Guards Corps. He commanded the Guards Corps until August 1918 when he took command of the III Corps until the end of the war. After the end of the war, Böckamnn retired. He died on 18 November 1921 at the age of 62 in Bad Wildungen.

Awards
Order of the Red Eagle, III Class with the bow and with a crown
Order of the Crown, II Class
Service award
Order of Albert the Bear, II Class (Commander)
Order of the Zähringer Lion, II Class (Commander)
Military Merit Order, Officer
Order of Philip the Magnanimous, II Class (Commander)
Order of the Griffon, Commander
Princely Reuss Honor Cross, II Class
Albert Order, Officer's Cross
, III Class
Iron Cross, I and II Classes (1914)
House Order of Hohenzollern, Commander with swords (March 1915)
Pour le Mérite, 8 October 1916
Pour le Mérite with oak leaves on 1 June 1917

References

Bibliography
 Karl-Friedrich Hildebrand, Christian Zweng: Die Ritter des Ordens Pour le Mérite des I. Weltkriegs. Volume 1: A–G. Biblio Verlag, Osnabrück 1999, p. 129–131.

1859 births
1921 deaths
People from the Province of Brandenburg
German Army generals of World War I
Recipients of the Pour le Mérite (military class)
Recipients of the Iron Cross (1914), 1st class
Recipients of the Iron Cross (1914), 2nd class
Recipients of the Military Merit Order (Bavaria)
Military personnel from Potsdam